Selvaraj, also known as Kavithapithan, was elected to the Tamil Nadu Legislative Assembly from the Kolathur constituency in the 1996 elections. The constituency was reserved for candidates from the Scheduled Castes. He was a candidate of the Dravida Munnetra Kazhagam (DMK) party.

References 

Tamil Nadu MLAs 1996–2001
Dravida Munnetra Kazhagam politicians
Year of birth missing
Possibly living people